The Man to Beat Jack Johnson is a 1910 British short black-and-white silent comedy film, produced by the Tyler Film Company, featuring four-year-old Willy Sanders demonstrating his boxing and wrestling skills against an adult opponent. The film, "has the feel of a filmed music hall act (which it may have been)" thanks, according to Michael Brooke of BFI Screenonline, to a, "simple idea (and a slightly disturbing one)," which is, "primitive in its execution." A clip from this film is featured in Paul Merton's interactive guide to early British silent comedy How They Laughed.

References

External links

British black-and-white films
British silent short films
British boxing films
1910 short films
British sports comedy films
British comedy short films
1910s sports comedy films
1910 comedy films
1910 films
1910s British films
Silent sports comedy films